A vacuum Rabi oscillation is a damped oscillation of an initially excited atom coupled to an electromagnetic resonator or cavity in which the atom alternately emits photon(s) into a single-mode electromagnetic cavity and reabsorbs them. The atom interacts with a single-mode field confined to a limited volume V in an optical cavity. Spontaneous emission is a consequence of coupling between the atom and the vacuum fluctuations of the cavity field.

Mathematical treatment
A mathematical description of vacuum Rabi oscillation begins with the Jaynes–Cummings model, which describes the interaction between a single mode of a quantized field and a two level system inside an optical cavity. The Hamiltonian for this model in the rotating wave approximation is

 

is the strength of the coupling between the dipole moment  of the two level system and the cavity mode with volume  and electric field polarized along .

The energy eigenvalues and eigenstates for this model are 

where  is the detuning, and the angle  is defined as

Given the eigenstates of the system, the time evolution operator can be written down in the form

If the system starts in the state , where the atom is in the ground state of the two level system and there are  photons in the cavity mode, the application of the time evolution operator yields

The probability that the two level system is in the excited state  as a function of time  is then

where  is identified as the Rabi frequency. For the case that there is no electric field in the cavity, that is, the photon number  is zero, the Rabi frequency becomes . Then, the probability that the two level system goes from its ground state to its excited state as a function of time  is
 

For a cavity that admits a single mode perfectly resonant with the energy difference between the two energy levels, the detuning  vanishes, and  becomes a squared sinusoid with unit amplitude and period

Generalization to N atoms
The situation in which  two level systems are present in a single-mode cavity is described by the Tavis–Cummings model

, which has Hamiltonian

Under the assumption that all two level systems have equal individual coupling strength  to the field, the ensemble as a whole will have enhanced coupling strength .

See also
 Jaynes–Cummings model
 Quantum fluctuation
 Rabi cycle
 Rabi frequency
 Rabi problem
 Spontaneous emission

References and notes

Quantum optics
Atomic physics
Atomic, molecular, and optical physics